This is a list of photographs considered the most important in surveys where authoritative sources review the history of the medium not limited by time period, genre, topic, or other specific criteria. These images may be referred to as the most important, most iconic, or most influential—but they are all considered key images in the history of photography.

19th century

Before 1850
 Nicéphore Niépce, View from the Window at Le Gras, 1827.Considered the oldest surviving camera photograph.
 William Henry Fox Talbot, Windows From Inside South Gallery, Lacock Abbey, August 1835.The earliest surviving photographic negative and the earliest surviving paper photograph.
 Louis Daguerre, Boulevard du Temple, Paris, 3rd arrondissement, 1838.
 Hippolyte Bayard, Self‐Portrait as a Drowned Man (Le Noyé), 1840.
 William Henry Fox Talbot, The Haystack, 1844.

1850s
 Nadar, The Mime Charles Debureau as Pierrot, 1854.
 Roger Fenton, The Valley of the Shadow of Death, 1855.
 John Mayall, Sergeant Dawson and his Daughter, 1855.
 Gustave Le Gray, The Brig, 1856.
 Robert Howlett, Isambard Kingdom Brunel Standing Before the Launching Chains of the Great Eastern, 1857.
 Shiro Ichiki, Portrait of Nariakira Shimazu, 1857.
 Oscar Gustave Rejlander, Two Ways of Life, 1857.
 Camille Silvy, La Vallée de l'Huisne (River Scene), 1857.
 Henry Peach Robinson, Fading Away, 1858.

1860s
 Mathew Brady, Abraham Lincoln, 1860.
 James Wallace, First Aerial Photograph, 13th October, 1860.
 Carleton Watkins, Cathedral Rock, 1861.
 Alexander Gardner, The Dead of Antietam, 1862.
 McAllister & Brothers, Gordan (The Scourged Back), 1863
 Alexander Gardner, Execution of the Lincoln Conspirators at Washington Arsenal, 1865.
 Julia Margaret Cameron, Portrait of Sir John Herschel, 1867.
 Andrew J. Russell, Beckoning West, 1869.

1870s
 William Henry Jackson, Lower Yellowstone Falls, 1871.
 Timothy O’Sullivan, Ancient Ruins in the Canyon de Chelly, 1873.
 Eadweard Muybridge, The Horse in Motion, 1878.

1880s
 Frank Meadow Sutcliffe, Water Rats, 1886.
 Jacob Riis, Bandits' Roost, 59 1/2 Mulberry Street, 1888.

1890s
 Wilhelm Conrad Röntgen, The Hand of Mrs. Wilhelm Röntgen, 1895.
 Clarence H. White, Girl with a Mirror, 1898.
 Louis Boutan, First Underwater Photo, 1899.

20th century

1900s
 Frederick Evans, A Sea of Steps (Wells Cathedral), 1903.
 John T. Daniels, First Flight, 1903.
 Edward S. Curtis, The Vanishing Race, 1904.
 Edward Steichen, The Pond—Moonlight, 1904.
 Alfred Stieglitz, The Steerage, 1907.
 Lewis Hine, Child Laborer in Newberry, South Carolina Cotton Mill, 1908.
 Lumiere Brothers, Cactus Hot Air Balloon, 1909.

1910s
 Lewis Hine, Breaker Boys, 1911.
 Brown Brothers, Triangle Shirtwaist Fire, 1911.
 E.J. Bellocq, Prostitute, New Orleans, 1912.
 Hiram Bingham III, The First Photograph Upon Discovery of Machu Picchu, 1912.
 Jacques-Henri Lartigue, Grand Prix of the Automobile Club de France, 1912.
 Paul Strand, Abstraction, Porch Shadows, 1916.
 Paul Strand, Blind Woman, New York, 1916.

1920s
 Edward Weston, Armco Steel, 1922.
 Man Ray, Le Violon d'Ingres (Ingres’ Violin), 1924.
 Rudolf Koppitz, Movement Study, 1926.
 August Sander, Bricklayer, 1928.
 August Sander, The Pastry Cook, 1928.
 Tina Modotti, Woman of Tehuantapec, 1929.

1930s
 Edward Weston, Pepper No. 30, 1930.
 Man Ray, Glass Tears, 1930.
 Miami police department, Al Capone Mug Shot, 1931.
 Erich Salomon, The Hague, 1930.
 Henri Cartier-Bresson, Place de l’Europe (Behind the Gare Saint-Lazare), 1932.
 Henri Cartier-Bresson, Brussels, 1932.
 James VanDerZee, Couple in Raccoon Coats, 1932.
 Wanda Wulz, Lo + gatto (I + Cat), 1932.
 Lunch atop a Skyscraper, 1932. (Photographer cannot be attributed with certainty - See article.) 
 Alexander Rodchenko, Girl with a Leica, 1934.
 Heinrich Hoffmann, Hitler at a Nazi Party Rally, 1934.
 Ian Wetherell, Loch Ness Monster, 1934.
 Madame Yevonde, Lady Milbanke as ‘Queen of the Amazons’, 1935.
 Dorothea Lange, Migrant Mother, 1936.
 Margaret Bourke-White, Fort Peck Dam, 1936.
 Margaret Bourke-White, Fort Peck Dam Liner, 1936.
 Robert Capa, The Falling Soldier (Death in Spain), 1936.Death of Republican soldier Federico Borrell García in the Spanish Civil War.
 Herbert List, Goldfish Bowl, 1937.
 Margaret Bourke-White, The Louisville Flood, 1937.
 Sam Shere, The Hindenburg Disaster, 6 May 1937.
 H. S. Wong, Bloody Saturday, 28 August 1937.
 Henri Cartier‐Bresson, Sunday on the Banks of the Marne, also known as Juvisy, France, 1938.
 Horst P. Horst, Mainbocher Corset, 1939.
 Margaret Bourke-White, Aerial View of Manhattan, 1939.
 Bill Brandt, The Lambeth Walk, c. 1939.
 Weegee, Mulberry Street, 1939.

1940s
 Edward Weston, Tide Pool, 1940.
 Ansel Adams, The Tetons and the Snake River, 1942.
 Yousuf Karsh, The Roaring Lion, Winston Churchill, 1941.
 Ansel Adams, Moonrise, Hernandez, New Mexico, 1 November 1941.
 Dmitri Baltermants, Grief, 1942.
 Gordon Parks, Ella Watson (American Gothic), 1942.
 Frank Powolny, Betty Grable, 1943.
 George Strock, Three American Soldiers Ambushed on Buna Beach, 1943.
 Unknown, Jewish Boy Surrenders in Warsaw, 1943.
 Weegee, The Critic, 1943.
 Robert Capa, The Magnificent Eleven (collection of 11 photos), 6 June 1944.
 Robert F. Sargent, Into the Jaws of Death, 6 June 1944.
 Unknown, The Gadget, 1945.
 Lieutenant Charles Levy, Mushroom Cloud Over Nagasaki, 1945.
 Bernard Hoffman, Atomic Destruction, 1945.
 Carl Mydans, Return to the Philippines, 1945.
 Unknown, Inside Buchenwald, 1945.
 Joe Rosenthal, Raising the Flag on Iwo Jima, 23 February 1945.
 Yevgeny Khaldei, Raising a Flag over the Reichstag, 2 May 1945.
 Alfred Eisenstaedt, V-J Day in Times Square, 14 August 1945."In New York's Times Square a white-clad girl clutches her purse and skirt as an uninhibited sailor plants his lips squarely on hers".
 Margaret Bourke-White, Gandhi at his Spinning Wheel, 1946.Mahatma Gandhi reading beside his spinning wheel.
 Amit Shabi, Dead Sea Scrolls, 1947.
 Andreas Feininger, Route 66, 1947.
 Eric Hosking, Barn Owl with Vole, 1948.
 Nat Fein, The Babe Bows Out, 1948.
 Philippe Halsman, Dalí Atomicus, 1948.
 W. Eugene Smith, Country Doctor, 1948.
 Leonard McCombe, Career Girl, 1948.
 Willy Ronis, Provençal Nude, 1949.
 Ralph Morse, Nuns Watching Television, 1949.
 Leonard McCombe, Clarence Hailey Long, 1949.

1950s
 Robert Doisneau,  The Kiss at the Hôtel de Ville (Les Amants de l'Hôtel de Ville), 1950.
 Rosalind Franklin and Raymond Gosling, X-ray diffraction, 1951.X-ray diffraction image providing key to DNA structure.
 Arthur Sasse, Albert Einstein, 1951.
 J.R. Eyerman, Trouble in Lakewood, 1952.
 Dmitri Baltermants, The Announcement of Stalin's Death, 1953.
 Hy Peskin, Camelot, 1953.
 Alfred Gregory, Atop Mount Everest, 1953.
 Matty Zimmerman, Monroe, 1954.
 David Jackson, Emmett Till, 1955.
 Richard Avedon, Dovima with Elephants, 1955.
 Robert Frank, TrolleyNew Orleans, 1955.
 O. Winston Link, Hot Shot Eastbound at Iaeger Drive‐In, 1956.
 Charles Trainer, The New King, 1956.
 Harold E. Edgerton, Milk Drop Coronet, 1957.
 Russell Kirsch, First Digital Photo, 1957.
 Will Counts, Elizabeth Eckford, 1957.
 Ansel Adams, Aspens, 1958.

1960s
 Alberto Korda, Guerrillero Heroico (Che Guevara), 5 March 1960.
 Julius Shulman, Case Study House no. 22, Los Angeles, 1960.
 Peter Leibing, Leap into Freedom, 15 August 1961.Hans Conrad Schumann, an East German soldier running away over barbed-wire in Berlin.
 Charles Moore, Birmingham, Alabama, 1963.
 Malick Sidibè, Nuit de Noël (Happy Club), 1963.
 Malcolm Browne, The Burning Monk (Thích Quảng Đức self-immolation), 11 June 1963.
 NPS, "I Have a Dream", 28 August 1963.
 Abraham Zapruder, Zapruder film of the John F. Kennedy assassination, 22 November 1963.
 Robert H. Jackson, Lee Harvey Oswald, 24 November 1963.
 Harry Benson, Pillow Fight, 1964.
 Hugo van Lawick, Jane Goodall Greets Baby Chimp, 1965.
 Lennart Nilsson, New View of Life, Fetus 18-Weeks, 1965.
 Neil Leifer, Muhammad Ali vs. Sonny Liston, 1965.
 Hou Bo, Chairman Mao Swims in the Yangtze, 1966.
 Larry Burrows, Reaching Out, 1966.
 Mary Quant, Twiggy, 1966.
 Bernie Boston, Flower Power, 21 October 1967.
 D.A. Pennebaker, The Jimi Hendrix Experience, 1967.
 Eddie Adams, General Nguyen Ngoc Loan executing a Viet Cong prisoner in Saigon, 1 February 1968.
 Ronald L. Haeberle, Massacre of Villagers at My Lai, 16 March 1968.
 Joseph Louw, Assassination of Martin Luther King, Jr., 4 April 1968.
 Bill Eppridge, Assassination of Robert Kennedy, 5 June 1968.
 Josef Koudelka, Invasion of Prague, 1968.
 John Dominis, Black Power Salute, Mexico City Olympics, 16 October 1968.
 William Anders, Earthrise, 24 December 1968.
 Don McCullin, Albino Boy, Biafra, 1969.
 Bill Eppridge, Woodstock, 1969.
 Neil Armstrong, Buzz Aldrin on the Moon, 21 July 1969. 
 Buzz Aldrin, Apollo 11 bootprint, 21 July 1969. 
 Unknown, Altamont, 6 December 1969.

1970s
 John Paul Filo, Kent State Shootings, 1970.
 Ollie Atkins, Elvis Meets Nixon, 1970
 Ron Galella, Windblown Jackie, 1971.
 1972 — Harrison Schmitt, The Blue Marble. Earth from Apollo 17.
 Ollie Atkins, Nixon in China, 1972.
 Huynh Cong “Nick” Ut, Napalm attack, 1972.
 Kurt Strumpf, Munich Massacre, 1972.
 Harold E. Edgerton, Bullet Passing through a Candle Flame, 1973.
 Luis Orlando Lagos, Allende's Last Stand, 1973.
 Bernd and Hilla Becher, Water‐Towers, 1974.
 Rolls Press, Nixon Resignation, 1974.
 Mervyn Bishop, Prime Minister Gough Whitlam Pours Soil into the Hand of Traditional Gurindji Landowner Vincent Lingiari, 1975.
 Stanley Forman, Fire Escape Collapse, 1975.
 Sam Nzima, Soweto Uprising (Hector Pieterson), 1976.
 Viking 1, The Red Planet, 1976.
 Eddie Adams, Boat of No Smiles, 1977.
 Cindy Sherman, Untitled Film Stills, 1977–1980.
 Jahangir Razmi, Firing Squad in Iran, 1979.
 Robert Mapplethorpe, Brian Ridley and Lyle Heeter, 1979.
 Susan Meiselas, Molotov Man, 1979.

1980s
 Annie Leibowitz, John Lennon and Yoko Ono, 1980.
 Heinz Kluetmeier, Miracle on Ice, 1980.
 Helmut Newton, Self‐Portrait with Wife and Model, 1981.
 Patrick Lichfield, Diana with Bridesmaids in Buckingham Palace, 1981.
 Donna Ferrato, Behind Closed Doors, 1982.
 Nancy Burson, Androgyny (6 Men + 6 Women), 1982.
 Co Rentmeester, Michael Jordan, 1984.
 Steve McCurry, Sharbat Gula, Afghan Girl, 1984
 NASA, Hole in the Ozone, 1985.
 Alon Reininger, Ken Meeks, Patient with AIDS, Being Cared for by a Friend, San Francisco, California, 1986.
 Andres Serrano, Immersions (Piss Christ), 1987.
 James L. Stanfield, The First Heart Transplant in Poland, 1987.
 National Enquirer, Monkey Business, 1987.
 Walter Looss Jr., Air Jordan, 1988.
 Jeff Widener, Tank Man, 1989. Man confronting column of tanks.
 Richard Prince, Untitled (Cowboy), 1989.
 Robert Maass, The Wall Falls, 1989.

1990s
 Therese Frare, The Face of AIDS, 1990.
 Annie Leibovitz, Demi Moore, 1991.
 David Turnley, Operation Desert Storm, 1991.
 Steve McCurry, Camels in the Oil Fields, 1991.
 James Nachtwey, Famine in Somalia, 1992.
 Jeff Wall, Dead Troops Talk, 1992.
 Ron Haviv, Bosnia, 1992.
 Kevin Carter, The Vulture and the Little Girl, 1993.
 Charles Porter, Oklahoma City Bombing, 1995.
 Hubble Space Telescope / NASA, Pillars of Creation, 1995.
 Dirck Halstead, Bill Clinton hugs Monica Lewinsky, 1996.
 Charles O'Rear, Bliss, 1996.
 Philippe Kahn, First Cell-Phone Picture, 1997.
 Andreas Gursky, 99 Cent II Diptychon, 1999.
 Carol Guzy, Kosovo Refugees, 1999.
 Robert Beck, World Cup Winners, 1999.

21st century

2000s
 Alan Diaz, Elian Gonzalez Federal Raid, 2000.
 Michael Nichols, Surfing Hippos, 2000.
 Doug Mills, President George W. Bush Learns of the September 11th Attacks, 2001.
 Patrick Witty, New Yorkers watch the collapse of the South Tower of the World Trade Center, 2001.
 Richard Drew, The Falling Man, 2001.
 Shannon Stapleton, Father Judge, 2001.
 Thomas E. Franklin, Raising the Flag at Ground Zero, 2001.
 Marcus Bleasdale, Sakura Lisi, 2004.
 Sgt. Ivan Frederick, The Hooded Man, 2004.</p>
 Tami Silicio, Coffin Ban, 2004.
 Chris Hondros, Iraqi Girl, 2005.
 Eric Gay, Hurricane Katrina Evacuation, 2005.
 Robert Galbraith, Hurricane Katrina, 2005.
 David Phillip, Hurricane Katrina, 2005.
 Todd Heisler, Jim Comes Home, 2005.
 Brent Stirton, Gorilla in the Congo, 2007.
 John Moore, Memorial Day at Arlington National Cemetery, 2007.
 Louie Favorite, Homecoming, 2007.
 Oded Bality, The Power of One, 2007.
 Heinz Kluetmeier, Photo Finish, 2008.
 Marcio Sanchez, Married at Last, 2008.
 Win McNamee, The New First Family, 2008.
 Barbara Davidson, Funeral of Edwin Cobbin, 2009.
 Marcos Tristao, Diego Frazão Torquato, 2009.
 Pete Souza, Hair Like Mine, 2009.
 Unknown, The Death of Neda, 2009.

2010s
 Kevin Systrom, First Instagram Photo, 2010.
 Justin Lane, 9/11 Memorial, 2011.
 Richard Lam, Vancouver riot kissing couple, 2011.
 Pete Souza, The Situation Room, 2011.
 Jessica Hill, Newtown Massacre, 2012.
 Lucas Jackson, Fashion Week, 2012.
 Rodrigo Abd, Aida, 2012.
 Filippo Monteforte, View of the Costa Concordia, 2012
 Kevork Djansezian, Endeavour moving through Los Angeles, 2012
 Shannon Hicks, Sandy Hook, 2012.
 AFP, China Social Suicide, 2013.
 David Guttenfelder, North Korea, 2013.
 John Tlumacki, Boston Marathon Bombing, 2013.
 Taslima Akhter, Couple Found in Rubble of Bangladesh Factory Collapse, 2013.
 Tyler Hicks, Nairobi Mall Attack, 2013.
 Bradley Cooper, Oscars Selfie, 2014.
 Bülent Kiliç, Turkey Mine Blast, 2014.
 UNRWA, Yarmouk Refugees, 2014.
 Nilufer Demir, Alan Kurdi, 2015
 Emin Menguarslan, Turkish Coast Guard Rescue, 2016.
 Sergio Pitamitz, Climate Change, 2018.

2020s
 Tayfun Coskun, Capitol Under Attack, 2021.
 United States Air Force, Out of Afghanistan, 2021.

See also
 Fine-art photography
 History of the camera
 History of photography
 People notable for being the subject of a specific photograph
 Lists of photographs
 List of most expensive photographs
 World Press Photo of the Year

Notes

Sources
These surveys of the history of photography determine which images are included in the list.

Additional references

Lists of photographs
Photographs